is a Japanese actor. He has appeared in more than ten films since 1993, most notably inWild Zero and Sawako Decides.

Selected filmography
Film

Television

External links 

1974 births
Living people
Japanese male film actors
20th-century Japanese male actors
21st-century Japanese male actors